CHSP-FM is a Canadian radio station that broadcasts a country format at 97.7 FM in St. Paul, Alberta. The station is branded on-air as Real Country 97.7 as part of the Real Country network branding in Alberta.

The station signed on in 1975 and was owned by Newcap Broadcasting, until they were bought out by Stingray Group.

On April 21, 2009, Newcap radio received approval by the CRTC to convert CHLW to the FM dial at 97.7 FM. After the flip to FM, the station's new callsign will become CHSP-FM.

During the holiday season of 2009 (starting December 1) CHLW flipped to an all-Christmas music format, rebranding as "The Lakeland's holiday music station". They reverted to the original country format following the conclusion of the holiday season.

On December 30, 2011 the long-awaited flip to FM finally occurred when CHLW flipped to 97.7 FM. The station's format remains country. It is now called 97.7 The Spur.

In November 2016, CHSP rebranded under the Real Country brand, as with other Newcap-owned country stations in Alberta.

Former logo

References

External links
Real Country 97.7
 
 
 

Hlw
Hlw
Hlw
Radio stations established in 1975
1975 establishments in Alberta